Girolamo Dal Pane or Dalpane (1 October 1821 – 1856) was an Italian painter active in Bologna in a Neoclassical style.

Biography
Born in Bologna, starting in 1834, he attended the Collegio Artistico Venturoli. he gained fame in painting frescoes for palaces in Bologna, including the Palazzo Zagnoni-Spada Ceralli (1846); the Palazzo Malvezzi-Saraceni (1852-1853); and the Palazzo Bonasoni. The palazzo Malvezzi Saraceni was decorated with allegorical frescoes, including scenes from the Decameron and portraits of famous Italian writers. In 1854, Vincenzo Ghinelli commissioned Girolamo and Luigi Samoggia to redecorate the Teatro Gioacchino Rossini of Pesaro.

References

1821 births
1856 deaths
19th-century Italian painters
Italian male painters
Painters from Bologna
Italian neoclassical painters
19th-century Italian male artists